Phosphorothioic chloride difluoride or thiophosphoryl chloride difluoride is a chemical compound with formula PSClF2.  It is normally found as a gas boiling at 6.3 °C and melting at -155.2°. The density of the gas at standard conditions is 5.579 g/L.  Critical pressure is 41.4 bars, and critical temperature is 439.2K.

Production 
Phosphorothioic chloride difluoride was made in 1940 by reacting PSCl3 with SbF3 and SbCl5 at 75 C.

In another reaction PSCl3 reacts with KSO2F to make PSF3, KCl and SO2, but also partly yields PSClF2.

A small percentage of is formed when F2P(S)SP(CF3)2 or (CF3)2P(S)SPF2 react with chlorine.

It can be formed from difluoro(germylthio)phosphine: PF2(SGeH3) + Cl2 → GeH3Cl + PClF2S

Properties 
Although phosphorothioic chloride difluoride does not spontaneously ignite in air, mixtures with air are explosive.  The gas is hydrolysed slowly by water vapour. It also reacts with potassium hydroxide solution.

Heat of vapourization is 5703 cal/mol.

Infrared bands in the gas are at 946, 920, 738, 541, 395, 361, 317, missed, and 198 cm−1. In liquid, a Raman spectroscopy has bands at 939, 913, 727, 536, 394, 359, 314, 251, 207.  These are for PF2 symmetric stretch in a' and a'' symmetry, PS stretch, PCl stretch, PCl bend, PF2 scissor, PF2 rock, PS op-bend, and PS ip-bend.

The nuclear magnetic resonance coupling constants for 31P are 1220. It is a triplet line with intensities 1:2:1. The chemical shift from orthophosphoric acid is −50×10−6. For 19F the coupling constant is 1218. It is a doublet line in ratio 1:1. The chemical shift from CCl3F is −15.9×10−6.

References

Phosphorus halides
Thiophosphoryl compounds